The Galmihorn is a mountain of the Bernese Alps, overlooking the Fiescher Glacier in the canton of Valais. The main summit is distinguished by the name Vorderes Galmihorn and has an elevation of 3,506 metres. A secondary summit named Hinteres Galmihorn has an elevation of 3,486 metres.

The closest locality is Reckingen on the eastern side.

References

External links
Galmihorn on Hikr

Mountains of the Alps
Alpine three-thousanders
Mountains of Switzerland
Mountains of Valais
Bernese Alps